Edmilson Marques Pardal (simply known as Edmilson) is a Brazilian footballer.

Career

East Bengal
In 2007 Edmilson signed with East Bengal FC in the I-League 2007-08. In his only season with the club he played 27 matches while scoring 23 goals.

Prayag United
In 2009, Edmilson signed on with another Kolkata-based side Prayag United and played only one season in which he played ten games without scoring.

Southern Samity
In 2011 Edmilson decided to go to the I-League 2nd Division and signed with Southern Samity for the 2011 season. He played 4 games and scored twice as Southern Samity missed out on promotion.

Return to East Bengal
On January 13, 2011 it was announced that Edmilson would sign for East Bengal again after he signed with 2nd Division club Royal Wahingoh earlier and represented the club in Federation Cup. He has scored thrice for the club till now. On April 25, 2012 he scored the only goal in the 2012 AFC Cup match at San'a' against Al-Oruba in East Bengal's 4–1 defeat. On May 2, 2012 he again scored the only goal in 1–2 defeat against Kazma Sporting Club at Kolkata.

References

External links

 goal.com

Brazilian footballers
1980 births
Living people
Association football forwards
East Bengal Club players
Southern Samity players
Royal Wahingdoh FC players
United SC players